David Olatukunbo Alaba (born 24 June 1992) is an Austrian professional footballer who plays as a centre-back or left-back for La Liga club Real Madrid and captains the Austria national team. 

Alaba started out in Bayern's youth system before being promoted to the reserve team for the 2009–10 season. In January 2011, Alaba joined TSG 1899 Hoffenheim on loan until the end of the 2010–11 season. He returned to Bayern at the start of the 2011–12 season, where he went on to become a regular member of the first-team squad. Alaba made over 400 appearances for Bayern Munich, winning 27 honours including ten Bundesliga titles and two UEFA Champions League titles in 2013 and 2020, both as part of trebles. During his time in Germany, he was named in the UEFA Team of the Year three times. In 2021, Alaba signed for Real Madrid; he won the 2021–22 La Liga, Supercopa and Champions League title in his debut season.

Alaba is Austria's second youngest player to play for their senior national team, debuting for them in 2009 as a 17-year-old. He has earned over 90 caps and represented his country at UEFA Euro 2016 and UEFA Euro 2020. He was voted Austrian Footballer of the Year on nine occasions (including six consecutive times from 2011 to 2016).

Club career

Early career
Born in Vienna, Alaba began his career with SV Aspern, his local club in Aspern, in the Vienna district Donaustadt, before joining the youth setup of FK Austria Wien at age 10. He rose through the ranks quickly, and in April 2008 he was named on the first-team substitutes' bench for an Austrian Bundesliga match. He also played five times for Austria Wien's reserve team, before leaving in summer 2008 to join German Bundesliga side Bayern Munich.

Bayern Munich

Youth, reserves and Hoffenheim loan
He started out in Bayern's youth system, playing for the under 17 and under 19 teams, before being promoted to the reserve team for the 2009–10 season. He made his debut in a 3. Liga match against Dynamo Dresden in August 2009 and scored his first professional goal for FC Bayern Munich II on 29 August 2009. He was named in Bayern Munich's squad for the 2009–10 UEFA Champions League, where he was assigned the shirt number 27. In January 2010, it was announced that Alaba would train with the first team for the rest of the 2009–10 season, along with reserve teammates Diego Contento and Mehmet Ekici.

The trio were named on the first-team substitutes' bench for the first time on 10 February 2010, for a DFB-Pokal game against SpVgg Greuther Fürth, and Alaba came on in the 59th minute, replacing Christian Lell. After one minute on the pitch, and with his second touch of the game, he set up Franck Ribéry to give Bayern a 3–2 lead, in a match they went on to win 6–2. He also became Bayern's youngest ever player in a competitive fixture, at 17 years, 7 months and 8 days old.

In January 2011, Alaba joined TSG 1899 Hoffenheim on loan until the end of the 2010–11 season. Later that month, he scored his first-ever goal in the Bundesliga in a 2–2 draw with FC St. Pauli.

2011–2013
Alaba returned to Bayern at the start of the 2011–12 season, where he became a regular member of the first-team squad. On 23 October 2011, Alaba scored his first league goal for Bayern in the 1–2 away loss against Hannover 96. On 20 December, Alaba was named Austrian Footballer of the Year for the first time. During the second half of the 2011–12 Bundesliga season, he established himself as a starter for Bayern. On 25 April 2012, he played in the 2011–12 UEFA Champions League semi-final second leg against Real Madrid, and scored Bayern's first kick of the shootout as they won 3–1 on penalties. However, due to being booked in the semi-final, Alaba was unable to play in the 2012 UEFA Champions League Final through suspension.

On 5 December, Alaba scored his first Champions League goal in a 4–1 win over BATE Borisov in the 2012–13 season. On 18 December, Alaba was named Austrian Footballer of the Year for the second year running. On 2 April 2013, Alaba scored the seventh-fastest goal (25.02 seconds) in Champions League history to set Bayern on their way to a 2–0 win over Juventus. On 25 May, he played the full 90 minutes at left-back as Bayern beat Borussia Dortmund 2–1 in the 2013 UEFA Champions League Final.

2013–2015

During the 2013–14 season, he played in the 2013 DFL-Supercup against Borussia Dortmund, the UEFA Super Cup against Chelsea, and two matches in the FIFA Club World Cup; the first against Guangzhou Evergrande and the second against Raja Casablanca. On 2 December 2013, Alaba signed a new contract with Bayern Munich, which would expire in 2018. On 20 December, Alaba was named Austrian Footballer of the Year for the third year running. In January 2014, Alaba was named as the left-back in the UEFA Team of the Year 2013 for the first time.

On 18 December 2014, Alaba was named Austrian Footballer of the Year for the fourth year running. In January 2015, he was voted as the left-back in the UEFA.com Team of the Year 2014 by users (352,070 votes) for the second consecutive year. On 31 March, Alaba suffered a medial ligament damage in his left knee during Austria's 1–1 friendly draw with Bosnia and Herzegovina. Alaba missed the rest of the season for Bayern because of the injury.

2015–2021
In August 2015 against his former club 1899 Hoffenheim, Alaba's misplaced pass resulted in Kevin Volland scoring in nine seconds, the quickest Bundesliga goal of all time. On 17 December, Alaba was named Austrian Footballer of the Year for the fifth consecutive year. On 8 January 2016, Alaba was voted as the left-back in the UEFA.com Team of the Year 2015 for the third consecutive year. On 18 March, he extended his contract until 2021. On 21 December, Alaba was named Austrian Footballer of the Year for the sixth year running. On 10 February 2018, Alaba made his 200th Bundesliga appearance in a 2–1 win over Schalke.

During the 2019–20 season, Alaba was converted to the centre-back position, often partnering up with Jérôme Boateng, due to an injury crisis. He adapted to the position very well and soon became the leader of the defence. On 23 August 2020, he played the full 90 minutes at centre-back as Bayern beat Paris Saint-Germain 1–0 in the 2020 UEFA Champions League Final. Bayern Munich went on to have their second treble-winning season after 2012–13, and thereby Alaba securing his second continental treble in his career.

After several attempts to extend his contract, Alaba mentioned that Bayern Munich asked him earlier whether he was interested in a swap deal with Leroy Sané from Manchester City, which he considered as a "slap in the face". On 16 February 2021, Alaba announced that he would leave Bayern Munich following the 2020–21 season after thirteen years with the club.

Real Madrid
On 28 May 2021, Spanish side Real Madrid announced they had signed Alaba on a five-year contract beginning on 1 July. He inherited the number 4 jersey, previously worn by the last captain Sergio Ramos over the past 16 seasons. He made his debut on 14 August, starting in a 4–1 win over Alavés. He scored his first goal on 24 October in a 2–1 win over Barcelona, his first El Clásico, becoming the second Austrian player to score in El Clasico history after Hans Krankl (1979). On 6 April 2022, Alaba made his 100th Champions League appearance in a 3–1 away win against Chelsea in the quarter-final of the competition.

On 10 August 2022, he got the opening goal in the 2022 UEFA Super Cup against Eintracht Frankfurt with Real Madrid going on to win 2–0. On 14 August, he scored the winning goal for Real Madrid from a free kick in a 2–1 away victory against UD Almería.

International career

Alaba played for Austria at under-17, under-19 and under-21 level. In October 2009, he was called up to the senior Austria national team for a match against France. He made his debut in this game, making him the youngest player in the history of the Austria national team. He scored his first goal for Austria on 16 October 2012 in a World Cup Qualifying game at home to Kazakhstan where Austria were 4–0 winners.

At the age of just 19, Alaba won the prestigious vote for Austrian Footballer of the Year in 2011. In the poll organised by APA (Austrian press agency) among the coaches of the ten Austrian Bundesliga clubs, Alaba finished top on 21 points, just ahead of Austria Wien's Dutch star Nacer Barazite (20 points) and VfB Stuttgart's Martin Harnik. In December 2012, he received the award for the second consecutive year. On 10 September 2013, Alaba scored the only goal of the game against Ireland in the 84-minute to give Austria a 1–0. He scored the final goal in Austria's 3–0 win in the final qualification match against Faroe Islands.

Alaba ended the 2014 FIFA World Cup qualification campaign as Austria's top scorer with six goals.

He scored a ninth-minute Panenka-style penalty kick on 8 September 2015 to open a 4–1 away win over Sweden at the Friends Arena in Solna. The result qualified Austria for UEFA Euro 2016, their first successful qualification campaign for the continental championship. Alaba played in all three group matches as Austria finished last in their group with one point.

On 24 March 2017, he captained Austria for the first time in a World Cup 2018 qualification game against Moldova in a 2–0 victory, deputizing in the absence of suspended captain Julian Baumgartlinger. Alaba played in eight matches as Austria failed to qualify for the 2018 FIFA World Cup.

Alaba captained Austria during the UEFA Euro 2020, in which they reached the knockout stages in that competition for the first time in their history.

Personal life
Alaba was born in Vienna to George and Gina Alaba and has one sister, a professional recording artist, named Rose May Alaba. His Yoruba Nigerian father is a prince from Ogere who is also a rapper and works as a DJ. His Visayan mother emigrated from the Philippines to work as a nurse. The footballer is a member of the Seventh-day Adventist Church.

Outside football
Alaba was chosen to be on the cover of FIFA 15 and FIFA 16 in Austria next to Lionel Messi.

Career statistics

Club

International

Scores and results list Austria's goal tally first, score column indicates score after each Alaba goal.

Honours

Bayern Munich
 Bundesliga: 2009–10, 2012–13, 2013–14, 2014–15, 2015–16, 2016–17, 2017–18, 2018–19, 2019–20, 2020–21
 DFB-Pokal: 2009–10, 2012–13, 2013–14, 2015–16, 2018–19, 2019–20
 DFL-Supercup: 2016, 2018, 2020
 UEFA Champions League: 2012–13, 2019–20
 UEFA Super Cup: 2013, 2020
 FIFA Club World Cup: 2013, 2020

Real Madrid
 La Liga: 2021–22
 Supercopa de España: 2021–22
 UEFA Champions League: 2021–22
 UEFA Super Cup: 2022
FIFA Club World Cup: 2022

Individual
 Austrian Footballer of the Year: 2011, 2012, 2013, 2014, 2015, 2016, 2020, 2021, 2022
 Austrian Sports Personality of the Year: 2013, 2014
FIFA FIFPro World11: 2021 
 UEFA Team of the Year: 2013, 2014, 2015
 UEFA Champions League Team of the Group stage: 2015–16
 UEFA Champions League Squad of the Season: 2019–20, 2020–21
 ESM Team of the Year: 2013–14
 France Football World XI: 2015
 Bundesliga Team of the Season: 2014–15, 2015–16
 ESPN FC Best Left-Back 2016
 La Liga Team of the Season: 2021–22

See also
 List of footballers with 100 or more UEFA Champions League appearances

References

External links

 Profile at the Real Madrid CF website
 
 
 
 

1992 births
Living people
Austrian people of Nigerian descent
Austrian people of Yoruba descent
Austrian people of Filipino descent
Austrian Seventh-day Adventists
Footballers from Vienna
Yoruba sportspeople
Austrian footballers
Association football defenders
Association football midfielders
FK Austria Wien players
FC Bayern Munich II players
FC Bayern Munich footballers
TSG 1899 Hoffenheim players
Bundesliga players
3. Liga players
La Liga players
UEFA Champions League winning players
Austria youth international footballers
Austria under-21 international footballers
Austria international footballers
UEFA Euro 2016 players
UEFA Euro 2020 players
Austrian expatriate footballers
Expatriate footballers in Germany
Expatriate footballers in Spain
Austrian expatriate sportspeople in Germany
Austrian expatriate sportspeople in Spain
Association football utility players